Human Rights Activists in Iran (also known as HRAI and HRA) is a non-political non-governmental organization composed of advocates who defend human rights in Iran.  HRAI was founded in 2006.

History
HRAI was founded in 2006 by a small group of Iranian activists who gathered to organize their protests against Iranian human rights violations. Beginning with a focus on defending political prisoners, and with no resources other than those freely available within Iranian society, the group grew and attracted more members and financial support. By 2009, they had grown large enough to attract the attention of the government, which began arresting organizers and members.

Later, during a period of relaxed government attitudes toward activism, the organization was able to officially register as a legal entity. The group coalesced into a defined structure with committees with specific responsibilities and specializations. During this time, HRAI achieved their most ambitious goals: cultural events, publications, outreach to political prisoners and human rights victims, and news and information networks.

However, on March 2, 2010, the government of Iran moved to break up HRAI. During the subsequent reconstruction of the organization, the organization registered as a United States non-profit organization and was invited to attend the annual NGO Conference sponsored by the United Nations. HRAI has also been invited to join the World Movement for Democracy and to participate in the human rights events sponsored by the governments of Canada, the United States, and the European Union.

Their publications and news gathering activities have continued and expanded with the addition of the Peace Line and Fourth Pillar outlets.

Goals
HRAI’s goals consist of promoting, safeguarding, and sustaining human rights in Iran. Through a network of news agencies and online outlets, the organization keeps the Iranian community and the world informed by monitoring human rights violations in the country and disseminating the news about such abuses. Additionally, HRAI strives to improve the current state of affairs in a peaceful manner and supports strict adherence to human rights principles.

Structure
The organization consists of three main groups divided into partners, members, and managers. HRAI's partners include its official associates and volunteers. The organization is managed by a central council consisting of the heads of departments all of whom are democratically elected.

HRAI is organized into several departments, each with responsibility over specific subgoals of the organization:

 Department of Statistics and Publications
 Administrations and Public Affairs
 Human Resources and Accounting
 International Affairs and Relations
 Legal Department

The organization uses various methods to achieve its goals, including reporting and news dissemination through its own news agency (HRANA), public education, legal assistance to human rights victims, organized protests, and engagement with the international human rights community.

Financial Resources
Before March 2011, HRAI received donations only from members and partners. Since then, HRAI has also been accepting donations from the U.S. National Endowment for Democracy.

Media outlets
In addition to its own official website, HRAI maintains a number of news agencies and news websites dedicated specifically to the mission of reporting on human rights violations within Iran. HRAI's news agency, HRANA, was the first news agency in Iran dedicated solely to reporting on human rights issues. HRAI also operates a committee known as the Fourth Pillar whose mission is to facilitate the free dissemination of information and to fight censorship and internet filtering within Iran. Finally, HRAI publishes a print journal called Peace Line. Published erratically at first, it has been released on a regularly monthly schedule since 2012, and features articles, interviews, editorials, and reports pertaining to current affairs and news.

Resources
HRAI makes several resources available to the public to research human rights issues within Iran.  Among these are the HRANA Library and Information Center, containing an electronic index collection of books and works produced by the organization as well as from outside sources; and the Center for Statistics and Records, a digital archive of human rights data and analysis.

References

External links
 Human Rights Activists in Iran (in Farsi)
 هرانا  (in Farsi)

Human rights in Iran
Mahsa Amini protests
International human rights organizations
Non-profit organizations based in Fairfax, Virginia
2006 establishments in Virginia
Organizations established in 2006